The Baymen were the earliest European settlers along the Bay of Honduras in what eventually became the colony of British Honduras (modern-day Belize).

Settlement 
The first Baymen settled in the Belize City area in the 1630s. They were buccaneers and pirates trying to outrun the Spanish rulers in Mexico and Central America. They found that they could make a living cutting and selling logwood to the home country. Many of the first Baymen settled on what is now the Northside of Belize City. They controlled all affairs of municipal and national government through the Public Meeting.

The Baymen established the system of slavery in Belize, in order to have servants to cut logwood. Some slaves were allowed their own plantations, while others had to depend on their owner's rations. The Baymen reluctantly allowed slaves to participate in the Battle of St. George's Caye against the Spanish and their slaves. In some cases they faced former slaves who had run away or been taken in by the Spaniards. Great Britain ended slavery in the colony in 1838. Initially the planters refused to sell land to freedmen. But Belizean slaveowners received the highest compensation, of more than 50 pounds, for selling plots of emancipated territories.

The British and Spanish engaged in frequent dispute over the territory even after the 1763 Treaty of Paris. This had ended the Seven Years' War conflict between the British and French. The British and Spanish also made arrangements under this treaty, including establishing British rights to cut logwood in the area of Belize. The Spanish, who controlled the neighboring colonies, chased out the Baymen four times between 1717 and 1780. Treaties in 1783 and 1786 gave them more security. But it was only after the Battle of St. George's Caye in 1798 did the Baymen gain full control of the settlement. It was admitted to  colonial status in 1863 in the United Kingdom.

Conflict with the Maya 
The Maya peoples of Belize had suffered from extended conflict over the centuries with the Spanish. Some had retreated to or already occupied the depths of the dense forests of central and western Belize. Buccaneers had frequently raided most of the coastal settlements, stealing crops, and taking men and women as slaves. Some Mayan slaves were sold in the British colony of Jamaica, and shipped for sale to their colonies of Virginia and the Carolinas.

When the supply of logwood began to diminish, and prices fell in Europe because other dyestuffs became available, the Baymen began to cut tropical cedar and mahogany. They had to go deeper into the forests for this wood, where they began to have hostile encounters with Maya villages. The Baymen reported attacks in 1788 and 1802.

But the main thrust of the Baymen clash with the Maya came in Corozal and Orange Walk districts as part of the Caste War. Belizean Maya challenged lumber encampments established by the Baymen, with limited success. Maya resistance continued until the 1870s, though by the late 19th century, the end of the Caste War brought such conflicts to a close.

Conflict with the Garifuna 
The Garinagu people had an ambivalent relationship with the Baymen. While the Baymen valued the Garinagu's agricultural skills, they wanted them to submit to European control and help capture refugee slaves. The Baymen began a campaign of misinformation, saying the Garinagu had practices of "devil worshipping" and "baby eating." This poisoned relationships between the Creoles and "Kerobs", as they were derogatorily called.

References

Piracy in the Caribbean
People from Belize City
Ethnic groups in Belize
European Belizean
17th century in Belize
18th century in Belize
Immigrants to Belize